Lantanophaga minima is a moth of the family Pterophoridae. It is known from the Galápagos Islands.

The wingspan is about 10 mm. Adults are on wing in March.

External links

Platyptiliini
Moths described in 1992